Emsland is the name of a region on the Ems River in western Lower Saxony and northern North Rhine-Westphalia. It is divided into the so-called Hanoverian and Westphalian Emsland.

 
Geography of North Rhine-Westphalia
Regions of Lower Saxony